Sitra Club is a sports club based in Sitra, Bahrain. The club was established in 1957. The main activities are football and basketball. The basketball and football teams competes in the Bahraini Premier League.

The previous chairman was Mr. Ali Al-Sawad for 10 years of services. The Board members was Ebrahim Al-Khudran, Essam Al-Jazeeri, Jalil Al-Jarmal, Jaffar Al-Jazeeri, Abdula Ameer Salman and Fuad Hassan. 

Mustafa Saad was the executive manager as well as Hussain Al-Sanadi was the executive secretary.

References

Football clubs in Bahrain
Basketball teams in Bahrain
1957 establishments in Bahrain